Garchitorena, officially the Municipality of Garchitorena, is a 4th class municipality in the province of Camarines Sur, Philippines. According to the 2020 census, it has a population of 29,436 people.

Its territory includes the islands of Quinalasag, Lamit, and Malabungot, also known as Mahad.

History

The original location of Garchitorena is said to be found at the mouth of the Pambuhan River but it was later transferred to Binanwahan primarily because of frequent attacks of the Moros.

Soon, a rich man by the name of Don Andres Garchitorena, who hailed from Tigaon town and owned in this place a vast portion of the land area, persuaded the townspeople to plant abaca. He later established an abaca processing plant which started the establishment of this coastal settlement.

The municipality was established on March 4, 1949, through Executive Order No. 205 signed by President Elpidio Quirino. It was originally named the municipality of Anderson. The municipality was then renamed after its founder and discoverer, Don Andres Garchitorena. He came from Tigaon. He was a member of Emilio Aguinaldo's Hong Kong Junta during the Spanish–American War. He became the governor of then Ambos Camarines in 1919. He is the father of Don Mariano Garchitorena, Secretary of Agriculture and Commerce and also Governor of Camarines Sur.

Geography

Barangays
Garchitorena is politically subdivided into 23 barangays.

Climate

Demographics

Bikol is the predominant language spoken.

Economy 

Local agricultural products in the town includes abaca, coconut, and palay. Electrical power is supplied by CASURECO (Camarines Sur Electric Cooperative).

References

External links
 [ Philippine Standard Geographic Code]
Philippine Census Information
Official Site of the Province of Camarines Sur
Philippine Standard Geographic Codes as of 30 June 2012

Municipalities of Camarines Sur
Establishments by Philippine executive order